Józef Czempiel (born 21 September 1883 in Piekary Śląskie – 4 May 1942) was a Polish Roman Catholic priest, activist. He was murdered in Dachau concentration camp.

On 13 June 1999, Czempiel was among 108 Polish martyrs of World War II, beatified in Warsaw by Pope John Paul II.

References

1883 births
1942 deaths
20th-century Polish Roman Catholic priests
Polish activists
Polish civilians killed in World War II
People from Piekary Śląskie
Polish people who died in Dachau concentration camp
Martyred Roman Catholic priests
People from the Province of Silesia
108 Blessed Polish Martyrs